Nauman Karim is a boxer from Pakistan.

He won the bronze medal in the light flyweight (– 48 kg) division at the 2003 World Amateur Boxing Championships in Bangkok. He also competed at the 2005 World Amateur Boxing Championships, but was stopped in the third round.

Year of birth missing (living people)
Living people
Flyweight boxers
Asian Games medalists in boxing
Boxers at the 2002 Asian Games
Boxers at the 2006 Asian Games
Pakistani male boxers
AIBA World Boxing Championships medalists
Asian Games silver medalists for Pakistan

Medalists at the 2002 Asian Games
21st-century Pakistani people